Huddinge HK is a handball club in Huddinge in Sweden, established 27 March 1971. The women's team has played in the Swedish top division.

Kits

References

External links
  
 

1971 establishments in Sweden
Handball clubs established in 1971
Swedish handball clubs
Sport in Stockholm County